Sundermann is a German surname. Notable people with the surname include:

 Axel Sundermann (born 1968), German footballer
 Collette Sunderman (born 1959), American director
 Jürgen Sundermann (born 1940), German footballer

German-language surnames